The production schedule is a project plan of how the production budget will be spent over a given timescale, for every phase of a business project.

The scheduling process starts with the script, which is analysed and broken down, scene by scene, onto a sequence of breakdown sheets, each of which records the resources required to execute the scene. These resources include:
 Cast Actors
 Special Effects
 Wardrobe
 Special Equipment
 Stunts
 Extras/Silent Bits
 Props
 Make-up/Hair
 Extras/Atmosphere
 Vehicles/Animals
 Sound Effects/Music
 Production Notes
 Others
From the breakdown sheets, the Production Manager compiles a production board which is used as the basis for a shooting schedule for every day of the shoot.

See also 
Breaking down the script

References 
 Film Scheduling by Dennis . King (2nd Ed, 1991)
 Film Production Management by Bastian Clevé (2nd Ed, 2000)
 The Complete Film Production Handbook (3rd Ed, 2001)
 Production board in Microsoft Office Excel by Eddy Grabczewski (2006)

Film production